Nadia Townsend (born 27 November 1979) is an Australian actress and film dramaturge. She portrayed Allie Kingston in the Channel 7 police drama, City Homicide, from 2009 to 2011. In 2009 she appeared in the United States produced science fiction thriller film, Knowing, playing Grace Koestler, alongside Nicolas Cage and Rose Byrne. She was assistant dramaturge on George Miller's film, Mad Max: Fury Road (2015).

Biography 

Nadia Townsend was born in Sydney on 27 November 1979 and lived in Gladesville, the younger daughter of television presenter, producer and print journalist, Simon Townsend (born 1945) and his second wife Rosanna ( 1950–2003). She grew up with an elder brother (born 1978). Their elder half-sister Lisbeth Kennelly (born  1968), had been put up for adoption soon after she was born: her parents (Simon and a former girlfriend) had already separated. The Townsend family were reunited with Kennelly in 1992, she had also become an actress.

As a child, Towsend began ballet lessons but was removed for talking too much. For secondary education she attended Hunters Hill High School, where she befriended fellow future actress, Rose Byrne, in a year 9 Science class. Townsend studied at the Australian Theatre for Young People, Sydney. After meeting visiting United States film and theatre actor, producer and director, Robert Bella, at age 18, she was accepted as a student at his Atlantic Theater Company, New York.<ref name=" She began working in theatre in 1999 and set up her first theatre company, Wolf Whistle. She acted in the Laurie Foell production, Chambres, in March–April 2000 at Belvoir Street Downstairs Theatre, Surry Hills.

Her first television role was playing Clare Gormley in the ABC drama series, Head Start (2001) for 18 episodes. Townsend took the role of Bec in Matt Bird-directed horror thriller film, Blue Neon (2001). She appeared in Fireflies (February–June 2004) as Fiona "Fifi" Sharp, a rural fire-fighter, for ABC-TV, which was produced by John Edwards. Townsend and her half-sister, Kennelly both acted in a theatre drama, Loss and Gloss (December 2004), co-written by mother-daughter writers, Helen and Sophie Townsend. She took the lead role of Liz, an abductee, in the black comedy feature film, Puppy (2005), alongside Bernard Curry as her abductor.

In 2008, Townsend relocated to Melbourne to study at the Victorian College of the Arts gaining her post-graduate degree in theatre directing. In 2009, Townsend appeared in the US-produced film, Knowing, playing Grace Koestler, opposite Hollywood star Nicolas Cage and Byrne. From August 2009, she portrayed a detective, Allie Kingston, in the Channel 7 police drama, City Homicide, starting in its third season in the episode, "Meet and Greet". She continued the role in season four (2010) and its mini-series continuation, City Homicide: No Greater Honour (2011).

In June 2013, she appeared in the theatre production of Neil LaBute's Helter Skelter at Old 505 Theatre, Surry Hills. She is also a film dramaturge, a rare job in Australia; she had been mentored by Nico Lathouris. In 2015, she was assistant dramaturge to Lathouris on George Miller's latest instalment of the Mad Max franchise, Mad Max: Fury Road. She is a co-founding member of Turtle Lab, a performance laboratory. In 2016, she appeared in the TV sci-fi thriller film, Restoration, playing Emma Laws.

Filmography

Film

Television

References

External links
 

Living people
Australian film actresses
Australian television actresses
Australian stage actresses
1979 births
Actresses from Sydney
Victorian College of the Arts alumni